Isaac Toucey (November 15, 1792July 30, 1869) was an American politician who served as a U.S. senator, U.S. Secretary of the Navy, U.S. Attorney General and the 33rd Governor of Connecticut.

Biography
Born in Newtown, Connecticut, Toucey pursued classical studies; studied law and was admitted to the bar at Hartford, Connecticut, in 1818. From 1825 to 1835 he had his own practice in Hartford, Connecticut. He married Catherine Nichols in Hartford on October 28, 1827. The couple never had any children.

Career
In 1822, Toucey was named prosecuting attorney of Hartford County, Connecticut. He served in that position until 1835, when he was elected to the 24th and 25th Congresses (at-large and then representing the 1st District). He served from 1835 to 1839. He lost the election of 1838 and returned to his position as prosecuting attorney in 1842.

In 1845, Toucey ran for Governor of Connecticut and lost, but the Connecticut State Legislature appointed him to the position following the election in 1846. During his tenure, an antibribery bill geared toward eliminating fraudulent electoral procedures was considered. He was defeated in an attempt at re-nomination in 1847.

In 1848, President James K. Polk appointed Toucey the 20th Attorney General of the United States, a position he held until 1849. He returned to Connecticut and took a place in the Connecticut Senate in 1850, and then in the Connecticut House of Representatives in 1852.

Toucey was elected to the U.S. Senate for the term commencing March 4, 1851, and served from May 12, 1852, to March 3, 1857, having that year declined to be a candidate for reelection. During that time, he often served as the legislative point man for Franklin Pierce and his administration.

James Buchanan, with whom Toucey had served in the Polk administration, appointed him U.S. Secretary of the Navy in his Cabinet in 1857 as a sop to the Pierce faction as well as to represent New England in the Cabinet. A moderate Northerner much in line with Buchanan's thought in the sectional controversies of the day, Toucey held that post until 1861 and the arrival of the Abraham Lincoln administration. During that time, Toucey would undergo criticism for alleged corruption as uncovered by the Covode Committee, resulting in him being censured by the House of Representatives in June 1860. Toucey was then replaced by one of his chief rivals in Connecticut, Gideon Welles. After 1861 he returned to his law practice.

Death and legacy
Toucey died in Hartford on July 30, 1869. He is interred at Cedar Hill Cemetery in Hartford, Connecticut. USS Toucey (DD-282) was named for him.

References

External links

 Connecticut State Library: Isaac Toucey, Governor of Connecticut from 1846 to 1847

National Governors Association
Govtrack US Congress
The Political Graveyard

|-

|-

|-

|-

|-

|-

1792 births
1869 deaths
19th-century American politicians
Buchanan administration cabinet members
Burials at Cedar Hill Cemetery (Hartford, Connecticut)
Connecticut lawyers
Democratic Party Connecticut state senators
Democratic Party members of the United States House of Representatives from Connecticut
Democratic Party governors of Connecticut
Democratic Party United States senators from Connecticut
Jacksonian members of the United States House of Representatives from Connecticut
Toucy, Isaac
People from Newtown, Connecticut
Politicians from Hartford, Connecticut
Politicians from Staunton, Virginia
Polk administration cabinet members
United States Attorneys General
United States Secretaries of the Navy
Union (American Civil War) political leaders